Dollars Trilogy, also known as the Man with No Name Trilogy or the Blood Money Trilogy, is an Italian film series consisting of three Spaghetti Western films directed by Sergio Leone. The films are titled A Fistful of Dollars (1964), For a Few Dollars More (1965) and The Good, the Bad and the Ugly (1966). Their English versions were distributed by United Artists, while the Italian ones were distributed by Unidis and PEA.

The series has become known for establishing the Spaghetti Western genre, and inspiring the creation of many more Spaghetti Western films. The three films are consistently listed among the best rated Western films in history.

Although not Leone's intention, the three films came to be considered a trilogy following the exploits of the same so-called "Man with No Name" (portrayed by Clint Eastwood, wearing the same clothes and acting with the same mannerisms). The "Man with No Name" concept was invented by the American distributor United Artists, looking for a strong angle to sell the films as a trilogy. Eastwood's character does indeed have a name (albeit a nickname) and a different one in each film: "Joe", "Manco" and "Blondie", respectively.

Films

A Fistful of Dollars (Per un pugno di dollari, 1964) 

The first film has the Man with No Name arriving, for unexplained reasons, in the Mexico–United States border town of San Miguel, base of two rival smuggling families, the Rojos and the Baxters. The Man with No Name (referred to by the old undertaker Piripero as "Joe") decides to play them against each other by collecting prizes for giving information, capturing prisoners and killing men, while also helping a woman, her husband and their son, held captive by the ruthless Ramón Rojo, to escape. He is discovered by the Rojos and tortured, but escapes. The Rojos massacre the unarmed Baxters while searching for him, but helped by Piripero he is hiding away from the town. The Man with No Name returns as the Rojos are preparing to hang the local innkeeper Silvanito, who had befriended him. He cold-bloodedly kills Don Miguel Rojo, uses his last bullet to free Silvanito, and engages and kills Ramòn in a gunslinging duel. After the last remaining Rojo brother, Esteban, is killed by Silvanito while trying to shoot from a window, the Man with No Name – knowing that the US and Mexican governments will investigate – departs from the now-peaceful town.

For a Few Dollars More (Per qualche dollaro in più, 1965) 

The second film introduces the Man with No Name (here nicknamed "Manco") as a bounty hunter killing bandits for money, as well as Colonel Douglas Mortimer, a middle-aged bounty hunter hunting for the same criminals. Both searching for the psychopathic Mexican bandit known as "El Indio", who just escaped from jail, they initially rival each other, but then understand that, in order to kill him, they must work together. Manco infiltrates El Indio's gang, while Mortimer acts from the outside. Manco discovers El Indio's elaborate plot to rob the Bank of El Paso, and is forced to take part in it, though he manages not to wound any innocents. Later, El Indio transfers his gang to Agua Caliente, Mexico, where Manco and Mortimer attempt to steal the money to take it back to the Bank. El Indio discovers their plot, but lets them escape as part of an operation to murder all but one of his associates in order to split the money in two instead of with the entire gang. Battle ensues between the bounty hunters and the bandits, according to El Indio's plan, as the two successfully kill all of them, and the one El Indio meant to spare is also killed. In the end, Manco discovers that Mortimer's hunt for El Indio is far more personal than his own, and lets him kill the bandit personally in a duel. Mortimer lets Manco keep all the money, and, now in peace with his past, rides away. Manco piles the bandit corpses in a horse-drawn cart and rides away with the stolen bank money to collect his bounty earnings.

The Good, the Bad and the Ugly (Il buono, il brutto, il cattivo, 1966) 

In the third film, set during the American Civil War, Mexican bandit Tuco Ramírez and the Man with No Name (whom Tuco calls "Blondie") work together to scam small towns:  Blondie will collect the bounties on Tuco and then free him as he is about to be hung.  Meanwhile, a mercenary named "Angel Eyes" is shown to be searching for a man named "Jackson", who has stolen 200,000 dollars from the Confederate Army.  Angel Eyes threatens the family of one of Jackson's former accomplices and learns that Jackson now goes under the alias of "Bill Carson" (who has already murdered both of his original accomplices).  The partnership between Blondie and Tuco sours when Tuco complains that being repeatedly placed in a noose with only a single bullet standing between himself and death demands a larger cut than 50/50; Blondie immediately betrays Tuco, saying "The way back to town is only 70 miles... if a man like you holds your breath, I think you can manage it".  Blondie is later caught out and tortured by a vengeful Tuco who first tries to put Blondie in a noose, but the raging war encroaches and drives them apart.  Tuco then catches Blondie and drags him through "this hell [...] a hundred miles, that's a nice walk": the high desert.  Tuco's erstwhile revenge is interrupted when they stumble upon a Confederate carriage carrying the bullet-riddled and barely-alive Bill Carson.  Carson, bleeding and desperate for water, tells Tuco the name of the cemetery in which the gold is hidden – but while Tuco goes to get water, a dying Blondie manages to crawl past and get the name of the grave in which the treasure is buried just as Carson dies.  Tuco realizes that he can't find the bounty without Blondie.  The two form an uneasy alliance.  During their journey to the treasure they are arrested by Union Army soldiers and brought to a prison camp in which Angel Eyes is posing as a Sergeant.  Angel Eyes tortures Tuco into revealing his half of the secret and recruits Blondie to show him the grave.  All three ultimately leave the prison.  Blondie, Tuco, and Angel Eyes commence a game of betrayal and subterfuge.  Tuco and Blondie are blocked by a brutal conflict between Union and Confederacy.  Blondie subsequently tricks Tuco into revealing the name of the cemetery.  The gunslingers eventually arrive at the graveyard where the treasure is hidden but find themselves in a three-way standoff with victory uncertain for anyone.  Blondie takes up a burnt-ended cigar and a rock; he tells the others that he will write the name of the grave marker on the bottom of a stone.  He then places the stone in the middle of the cemetery, and the film's iconic "Mexican standoff" duel begins.  After the duel, Blondie takes his half of the money and leaving Tuco in a noose, balancing on an unstable grave stone.  Blondie rides into the distance as Tuco curses him loudly. After Tuco nearly hangs himself, Blondie frees him from a distance using his rifle.

Development 

A Fistful of Dollars is an unofficial remake of Akira Kurosawa's 1961 film Yojimbo starring Toshiro Mifune, which resulted in a successful lawsuit by Toho.

The Good, the Bad and the Ugly is considered a prequel, since it depicts Eastwood's character gradually acquiring the clothing he wears throughout the first two films and because it takes place during the American Civil War (1861–1865), whereas the other two films feature comparatively more modern firearms and other props. For example, Lee Van Cleef's character in For a Few Dollars More appears to be a Confederate veteran who has come down in the world, and a graveyard scene in A Fistful of Dollars features a gravestone dated 1874.

Cast 
The only actors to appear in all three films besides Eastwood are Mario Brega, Aldo Sambrell, Benito Stefanelli and Lorenzo Robledo. Four other actors each appear twice in the trilogy, playing different characters: Lee Van Cleef, Gian Maria Volonté, Luigi Pistilli, and Joseph Egger.

The young boy at the beginning of "The good, the bad and the ugly" is the same boy who befriends Clint Eastwood in "For a Few Dollars More".

Music 
Composer Ennio Morricone provided original music score for all three films, although in A Fistful of Dollars he was credited either as "Dan Savio" or "Leo Nichols", depending on the print.

Principal cast

Crew

Reception

Critical reception

Box office performance

Accolades

Music

Soundtracks

Singles 
 "The Good, the Bad and the Ugly"
 "The Story of a Soldier"
 "The Ecstasy of Gold"

Literature

Novel series 
The Dollars Trilogy spawned a series of spin-off books focused on the Man with No Name, dubbed the Dollars series due to the common theme in their titles:

 A Fistful of Dollars (1972) , film novelization by Frank Chandler
 For a Few Dollars More (1965), film novelization by Joe Millard
 The Good, the Bad and the Ugly (1967), film novelization by Joe Millard
 A Dollar to Die For (1967) by Brian Fox
 A Coffin Full of Dollars (1971) by Joe Millard
 The Devil's Dollar Sign (1972) by Joe Millard
 Blood For a Dirty Dollar (1973) by Joe Millard
 The Million-Dollar Bloodhunt (1973) by Joe Millard

Comic series 
In July 2007, American comic book company Dynamite Entertainment announced that they were going to begin publishing a comic book featuring the Man with No Name, titled The Man With No Name. Set after the events of The Good, the Bad and the Ugly, the comic is written by Christos Gage. Dynamite refers to him as "Blondie", the nickname Tuco uses for him in The Good, the Bad and the Ugly. The first issue was released in March 2008, entitled, The Man with No Name: The Good, The Bad, and The Uglier. Luke Lieberman and Matt Wolpert took over the writing for issues #7–11. Initially, Chuck Dixon was scheduled to take over the writing chores with issue #12, but Dynamite ended the series and opted to use Dixon's storyline for a new series titled The Good, The Bad and The Ugly. Despite its title, the new series was not an adaptation of the film. After releasing eight issues, Dynamite abandoned the series.

Home media 
The films had various VHS releases in Italy and in other countries, including some editions boxed together with Leone's other Spaghetti Western films (Once Upon a Time in the West and Duck, You Sucker!).

The 1999 DVD, plus the 2010 and 2014 Blu-ray box set releases by MGM (distributed by 20th Century Fox Home Entertainment), make specific reference to the set of films as "The Man with No Name Trilogy".

References

Citations

Bibliography 

 

 
Italian film series
Sergio Leone